The Roman expansion in Italy covers a series of conflicts in which Rome grew from being a small Italian city-state to be the ruler of the Italian peninsula. Roman tradition attributes to the Roman kings the first war against the Sabines and the first conquests around the Alban Hills and down to the coast of Latium. The birth of the Roman Republic after the overthrow of the Etruscan monarch of Rome in 509 BC began a series of major wars between the Romans and the Etruscans. In 390 BC, Gauls from the north of Italy sacked Rome. In the second half of the 4th century BC Rome clashed repeatedly with the Samnites, a powerful tribal coalition of the Apennine region. By the end of these wars, Rome had become the most powerful state in central Italy and began to expand to the north and to the south. The last threat to Roman hegemony came during the Pyrrhic war (280–275 BC) when Tarentum enlisted the aid of the Greek king Pyrrhus of Epirus to campaign in the South of Italy. Resistance in Etruria was finally crushed in 265–264 BC, the same year the First Punic War began and brought Roman forces outside of the peninsula for the first time.

Conquered territories were incorporated into the growing Roman state in a number of ways: land confiscations, the establishment of coloniae, granting of full or partial Roman citizenship and military alliances with nominally independent states. The successful conquest of Italy gave Rome access to a manpower pool unrivaled by any contemporary state and paved the way to the eventual Roman interference of the entire Mediterranean world.

Sources 
The single most important source on early Roman history is the Roman historian Titus Livius (59 BC – 17 AD), usually called Livy in English literature, who wrote a history known as Ab urbe condita (From the Foundation of the City) covering the entirety of Rome's history from her mythical origins up to his own times in 142 books. Of these only books 1–10 and 21–45 have survived down to our times, covering the years from the foundation up to 293 and 220–167 BC. However summaries of the lost books have been preserved, and later historians such as Florus, Eutropius and Orosius used Livy as their source, so that we do have some knowledge of the contents of the lost books.

Independently of Livy the Greek historian Dionysius of Halicarnassus (c. 60 – after 7 BC) wrote Roman Antiquities in 20 books covering from Rome's origins to 264 BC, with emphasis on the earlier period. Of these the 11 first books have survived, covering the period down to 443. For the latter nine books only fragments exist.

Slightly earlier than Livy and Dionysius, the Sicilian Diodorus Siculus (flourished between 60 and 30 BC) wrote Bibliotheca historica, a universal history of the Mediterranean world in 46 books. From the historical section of this work books 11–20 survive intact, covering the years 480–302 BC. In these books Diodorus chiefly focuses on events in Sicily and the Eastern Mediterranean, but occasionally also refers to Roman history.

During the Roman Empire Livy became the standard account on early Roman history, most later histories are therefore ultimately derived from him and of little independent value. Cassius Dio (c. 150 – 235 AD) appears to have been an exception, frequently providing details not found in Livy or Dionysius. His books covering early Roman history survive only in fragments, but his work was summarized by the 12th-century monk Zonaras.

Finally, the Greek philosopher Plutarch (c. 46 – 120 AD) wrote a series of biographies on famous Greeks and Romans, the Parallel Lives, several of which deal with early Roman history. Of particular importance is his biography of king Pyrrhus of Epirus (319/318 – 272 BC), since for the years 292–264 BC no other substantial narrative has survived.

Reliability of the sources 

Livy and Dionysius were born 200 years after the completion of Rome's conquest of Italy and had to rely on earlier, now lost, historians as their sources. The Roman Republic of their times was in many ways fundamentally different from the one that conquered Italy. In antiquity history was primarily a literary genre where strict historical accuracy could be sacrificed in return for a more entertaining or stylistically impressive account. While modern historians generally agree that the sources contain a core of historical information, it is also clear that much of the material surviving to our time suffer from misinterpretations or the outright inventions of the ancient writers. Just how much, and which parts, date back to authentic records remains a matter of some dispute.

Another problem is that, except for the Pyrrhic War, all the sources are written from a predominantly Roman point of view. We therefore possess little knowledge of the motivations and internal politics of Rome's many enemies.

Chronology 
Rather than assigning an increasing number to each year, like the modern Gregorian calendar, the ancient Romans usually used an eponymous dating system where events were dated by the names of Rome's chief magistrates (typically two consuls). Roman magistrates were elected for one year; as long as the sequence of magistrates (called a fasti) and its synchronization with the modern calendar are known, dates can be converted from one dating system to the other. Thus the year when Marcus Tullius Cicero and Gaius Antonius Hybrida were consuls becomes 63 BC. During the late 1st century BC Roman scholars worked out a complete chronology of Roman history, dating the foundation of Rome to 753 BC and the beginning of the Roman Republic to 509 BC. 

Today known as the Varronian chronology (from one of its early adopters, the famous antiquarian Marcus Terentius Varro), this chronology was made official by the early Roman Empire and has remained the standard ever since. However, for the years prior to 300 BC the Varronian chronology is no longer considered correct. According to the respected Greek historian Polybius (c. 200–118 BC), the sack of Rome by a Gaulish warband took place in the same year as the Peace of Antalcidas, which was concluded in 387/386 BC. But according to the Varronian chronology the Gaulish sack happened three or four years earlier, in 390 BC. 

The Varronian chronology also claims that for five years, 375–371 BC, civil unrest and anarchy in Rome prevented any magistrates from being elected, and in four years, 333, 324, 309 and 301 BC, a dictator, rather than two consuls, was elected to govern Rome for an entire year (the normal maximum term for a dictator was six months). Historians now believe both the lengthy anarchy and the dictator years to be unhistorical. It is likely that Roman scholars who knew that the Gaulish sack and the Peace of Antalicidas were supposed to be synchronous discovered that their list of magistrates, due to errors in transmission, fell short. They then invented an extended anarchy and dictator years to pad out their chronologies to the desired length. By adopting both the anarchy and dictator years the Varronian chronology has thereby corrected the same problem twice and ended up being too long. Despite these acknowledged errors, academic literature continues, by old convention, to number years according to the Varronian chronology; this is therefore also the convention adopted in this article.

Early Roman wars 

According to traditional accounts Rome was first ruled by seven kings, Romulus, Numa Pompilius, Tullus Hostilius, Ancus Marcius, Lucius Tarquinius Priscus, Servius Tullius, Lucius Tarquinius Superbus, all of whom, except Numa, are recorded as fighting successful wars against Rome's neighbours. The historicity of these accounts is extremely doubtful. However, Rome must at some point in the regal period have extended her territory to include the Alban hills (traditionally attributed to Tullus Hostilius) and down to the coast (traditionally attributed to Ancus Marcius). These expansions made Rome by far the largest city-state in Latium.

The last king of Rome, Tarquinius Superbus, is portrayed by the sources as a powerful, but tyrannical, king. He is said to have taken Pometia by storm and Gabii by ruse, colonized Signia and Circeii, and to have organized the Latin states into an alliance under his own leadership. However Tarquinius was deposed by a conspiracy led by two of his relatives, Lucius Junius Brutus and Lucius Tarquinius Collatinus. These two then founded the Roman Republic with themselves as its first two consuls; traditionally the overthrow of the monarchy has been dated to 509 BC. Tarquinius is supposed to have sought refuge with king Lars Porsenna of Clusium, who marched against Rome to reinstate the king. After various heroic acts by brave defenders of Rome, Porsenna gave up and instead attacked Aricia, but was defeated by an alliance of Latin cities and the Greek colony of Cumae. Modern historians have had difficulties accepting this tale and have instead proposed that Porsenna actually captured Rome and deposed Tarquinius and replaced him with two leading aristocrats. With leadership of the city divided, Rome would have been easier for Porsenna to control.

With the departure of Porsenna, war broke out between Rome and the other Latin states leading to the Battle of Lake Regillus in either 499 or 496 BC. In 493 a treaty, the Foedus Cassianum, was concluded, establishing a mutual military alliance between the Latin cities with Rome as the leading partner. A second people, the Hernici, joined the alliance sometime later. While the precise workings of the Latin League remains uncertain, its overall purpose seems clear. During the 5th century the Latins were threatened by invasion from the Aequi and the Volsci, as part of a larger pattern of Sabellian-speaking peoples migrating out of the Apennines and into the plains. Several peripheral Latin communities appear to have been overrun, and the ancient sources record fighting against either the Aequi, the Volsci, or both almost every year during the first half of the 5th century BC. This annual warfare would have been dominated by raids and counter-raids rather than the pitched battles described by the ancient sources.

The beginnings of Roman expansion 

During the second half of the 5th century BC, the Romans and the Latins appear to have stemmed the tide. The sources record the founding of several Roman colonies during this era, while mention of wars against the Aequi and Volsci become less frequent. At about the same time Rome brought her ancient rivalry with the Etruscan city-state of Veii to a decisive end. In 426  BC Rome captured Fidenae, Veii's foothold on the southern side of the Tiber and in 396 BC Veii fell to Roman arms, supposedly after a ten-year siege. Rome annexed Veii's territory and enrolled her citizens as Roman citizens, significantly increasing Roman territory and manpower.

In 390 BC a Gaulish warband first defeated the Roman army at the Battle of Allia and then sacked Rome. Despite ancient sources' emphasis on the severity of the destruction, this appears to have been only a temporary setback for Rome. The records for the first half of the 4th century BC are confused, but Rome appears to have embarked on a deliberate policy of aggression against the Volsci. Fear of Roman expansionism increasingly brought the Latin cities into alliance with the Volsci in a complete reversal of the situation during the 5th century BC.

During the same time period Rome also fought wars against her neighbours in southern Etruria, the city-states of Caere, Tarquinii and Falerii, as well as fending off the occasional Gaulish incursion.

The Samnite wars 

The years 343 to 290 BC were dominated by a series of conflicts between Rome and the Samnites, a powerful coalition of Oscan-speaking peoples. Rome and the Samnites had concluded a treaty of alliance in 354 BC, but overlapping spheres of interest eventually brought them to war.

The chief result of the First Samnite War, 343–341 BC, was the expansion of Roman influence into Campania with an alliance with the important city-state of Capua. This war was closely followed by the Latin War, 340–338 BC, where the Latins and the Volsci made a final bid to shake off Roman dominion. Once again Rome was victorious. In the peace settlement that followed, Rome annexed some states outright, other remained autonomous Latin states, but the Latin League was dissolved. Instead the surviving Latin states were bound to Rome by separate bilateral treaties. The Campanians, who had sided with the Latins, were organized as civitas sine suffragio (citizenship without a vote), which gave them all the rights and duties of a Roman citizen, including that of military service, except the right to vote in the Roman assemblies. This peace settlement was to become a template for how Rome later dealt with other defeated states.

Rome spent the next years consolidating her latest conquests. In 328 BC war broke out between Rome and Neapolis, originally a Greek city state which by this date also had a significant Oscan population. This war ended when a pro-Roman faction among the Neapolitans took control of the city and concluded a treaty on favourable terms. Neapolis would remain a faithful Roman ally to the end of the Republic. This war is also notable for the first securely attested case of prorogatio when one of the consuls of 327 BC had his command extended into the next year.

The Roman alliance with Neapolis and colonization of Fregellae appear to have provoked the Samnites enough to cause the outbreak of the Second Samnite War in 326 BC. In 321 BC, Rome suffered a severe defeat when a Roman army had to surrender at the Caudine Forks and were forced to accept a truce with the Samnites. According to traditional accounts the Roman people at once repudiated the truce (concluded by the defeated consuls in the field) and in the next two years completely reversed the Caudine disaster by a series of impressive victories, followed by a two-year truce (318–317 BC). Modern historians have put little credence in this, instead believing Roman victories of 320 and 319 BC were later inventions and that Rome and the Samnites were at peace from 320 to 317 BC.

Hostilities broke out again in 316 BC. After another reversal at the Battle of Lautulae (an indecisive battle according to Livy, a Roman defeat according to modern historians, impossible to know the truth), the Romans gradually gained the upper hand. After the Roman capture of Bovianum, one of the Samnites' principal towns, the Samnites were forced to sue for peace in 304 BC.

Towards the end Second Samnite War, Roman military superiority was great enough that Rome could afford to at the same time launch campaigns into Etruria and Umbria in 311–309 BC. In 304 BC, Rome also won crushing victories against the Hernici and Aequi  and in the following years concluding treaties with the tribes of the Paeligni, Marrucini, Frentani and Vestini, extending her reach to the Adriatic.

The Third Samnite War broke out in 298 BC, apparently after the Samnites had attempted to ally with the Lucanians. When this failed, the Samnite commander Gellius Egnatius led his army north to form a coalition with the Etruscans, Umbrians and Gauls. The year 295 BC turned out to be the turning point of the war. The Romans managed to detach the Etruscan and Umbrian contingents by invading their homelands and then defeated the combined Samnite-Gaulish army at the battle of Sentinum. After suffering from a series of defeats and invasions, the Samnites were in 290 BC forced to accept an alliance on terms imposed by Rome.

Roman hegemony  

The loss of Livy's Books XI - XV means that much less information is available for the years 292–264 BC than the preceding decades. It is, however, clear that Roman expansion continued at an increasing pace, leading to the Roman Republic growing from being the dominant state of central Italy to becoming the hegemon of the entire peninsula. In 290 BC, the Roman consul Manius Curius Dentatus conquered the Sabines, who were annexed into the Roman state as citizens without a vote. During 284–280 BC the Romans fought a war against the Etruscans and Gauls in northern Italy. After first being defeated at the battle of Arretium, Rome won a decisive victory against the Gauls at the battle of Lake Vadimo leading to the Roman annexation of the ager Gallicus.

Simultaneously with these wars Rome's influence in the south was growing. In 285 or 284 BC the Greek city of Thurii appealed to Rome for aid against the Lucanians and Bruttians. In 284 BC, after defeating the Lucanians and Bruttians in battle, Rome installed a garrison in Thurii, supported by a small Roman fleet. This provoked the city of Tarentum, who had long considered herself the dominant Greek city in Magna Graecia. The Tarentines sunk the Roman fleet and captured Thurii, but having drawn the wrath of Rome, realized they needed allies to have any hopes of standing against Rome. Their choice fell on Pyrrhus, king of Epirus and a famous general. Pyrrhus crossed the sea to Italy with his army in 280 BC and that same year defeated the Romans at the battle of Heraclea and again the next year at the battle of Ausculum. These victories, however, proved to be strategically indecisive when they failed to convince Rome to accept peace on Pyrrhus' terms. With no end in sight Pyrrhus in 278 BC departed for Sicily to aid the Greek cities there against Carthage. He returned to Italy in 275 BC, but this time was defeated by the Romans at the battle of Beneventum. Pyrrhus then left Italy for Greece and after his death in 272 BC the Epirote garrison at Tarentum surrendered the city to the Romans, bringing the Pyrrhic war to an end. While details on these campaigns are scarce, there must also in these years have been extensive fighting between Rome and the Samnites, Lucanians and Bruttians. Roman victories against various combinations of these three peoples are recorded for every single year from 282 to 272 BC.

In the years following the Pyrrhic War, Rome completed the conquest of Italy by subduing the Umbrians and Picentes in the north and the Sallentini and Messapii in the south-east. In 264 BC, the consul Marcus Fulvius Flaccus put down a social uprising in the Etruscan city of Volsinii and reinstalled the old ruling families in power. That same year his colleague Appius Claudius Caudex led a Roman army across to Sicily, starting the First Punic War and a new phase in the history of the Roman Republic.

References

History of the Roman Republic
Wars involving the Roman Republic
3rd century BC in Italy
4th century BC in Italy
Military history of Italy
3rd century BC in the Roman Republic
4th century BC in the Roman Republic